Everything Is Burning (Metanoia Addendum) is an EP by IAMX released on 2 September 2016, serving as a companion piece to the band's sixth album, Metanoia, with seven previously unreleased tracks and nine remixes of Metanoia songs.

A demo of "Dead In This House" was featured on season 2, episode 8 and "Scars" was featured on season 3, episode 4 of the TV series How to Get Away with Murder.

Track listing
All songs written by Chris Corner.

Charts

References

IAMX albums
2016 albums